Gerard de Limesay, Lord of Wolverley, was a 12th-century English noble.

He was the eldest son of Alan de Limesay. Gerard succeeded his father in 1162 and died circa 1185. Upon the death of his son John in 1193 and grandson Hugh in 1198, without issue, the barony of Limesay was split into moieties between Gerard's daughters.

Marriage and issue
Gerard married Amica, daughter of Halenath de Bidun, they are known to have had the following issue:
John de Limesay (died 1193), married Alice de Harcourt, had issue. Hugh their son died without issue.
Aleanora de Limesay, married William de Lindsay, had issue.
Basilia de Limesay, married Hugh de Odingseles, had issue.

References
Banks, T.C. Baronia Anglica Concentrata, Or, A Concentrated Account of All the Baronies commonly called Baronies in Fee. Volume 2, 1843.
Nicolas, Nicholas Harris & Courthope, William. The Historic Peerage of England: Exhibiting, Under Alphabetical Arrangement, the Origin, Descent, and Present State of Every Title of Peerage which Has Existed in this Country Since the Conquest; Being a New Edition of the "Synopsis of the Peerage of England". John Murray, 1857.

12th-century English people